The Strange Colour of Your Body's Tears is a 2013 giallo film that was written and directed by Hélène Cattet and Bruno Forzani. It stars Klaus Tange as a man seeking the whereabouts of his missing wife, only to become entangled in a complicated web of lies and murder.

The film, which was a joint production between Belgian, French and Luxembourgian production companies, was given its world premiere on 12 August 2013 at the Locarno Film Festival in Switzerland and was given a limited theatrical release in the United States in August 2014.

Plot

Dan (Klaus Tange) is an average businessman that has returned home to find that his wife has gone missing. He decides to go from apartment to apartment to see if he can find her, but is unsuccessful in finding his wife. Dan does, however, encounter several people that tell him their own stories and secrets.

Cast
Klaus Tange as Dan Kristensen
Anna D'Annunzio as Barbara 
Jean-Michel Vovk as The Inspector
Sam Louwyck
Ursula Bedena
Joe Koener		
Birgit Yew 
Hans De Munter
Manon Beuchot	
Romain Roll	
Lolita Oosterlynck

Reception

Critical reception for The Strange Colour of Your Body's Tears has been mixed and the film holds a rating of 50% on Rotten Tomatoes, based on 46 reviews with an average score of 5.44/10. The website's critics consensus reads: "Bursting with visual style but suffering from a dearth of discernible narrative, The Strange Color of Your Tears is recommended only for giallo enthusiasts." The film also holds a rating of 53 out of 100 on Metacritic based on 17 reviews, indicating mixed or average reviews. It received four nominations at the 5th Magritte Awards exclusively in technical categories, winning Best Cinematography.

References

External links
 
 
 
 

2013 films
Giallo films
French crime thriller films
Belgian crime thriller films
2013 crime thriller films
Luxembourgian crime thriller films
Films about missing people
2010s French films